Hsieh Cheng-peng and Yang Tsung-hua were the defending champions, but only Cheng-peng participated this year. He partnered with Francis Casey Alcantara and won the final 6–4, 6–2, over Mikhail Biryukov and Yasutaka Uchiyama.

Seeds

Draw

Finals

Top half

Bottom half

External links
Main Draw

Boys Doubles
2009